Jiblah is a sub-district located in Jiblah District, Ibb Governorate, Yemen. Jiblah had a population of 16,566 according to the 2004 census.

References 

Sub-districts in Jiblah District